Wang Fuli (Chinese: 王馥荔; born 12 November 1949) is a Chinese actress.

Wang was born in Xuzhou, Jiangsu Province, and her ancestral hometown was Tianjin. She graduated from Jiangsu Drama College in 1967, majoring in Peking Opera. Wang later served as an actress of Jiangsu Provincial Peking Opera Troupe. In 1980, she became an actress of Jiangsu Provincial Play Troupe. After 1975, she appeared a series of films presented by Changchun Film Studio and Shanghai Film Studio. Wang made her breakthrough in 1980 in the film Legend of Tianyun Mountain, for which she nominated Golden Rooster Award for Best Actress. In 1984, she acted as "Juhua" in Za Men De Niu Bai Sui and won the 7th Hundred Flowers Awards for Best Supporting Actress. In 1985, her performance in Sunrise as "Cuixi" won the 9th Hundred Flowers Awards for Best Supporting Actress and 6th Golden Rooster Awards for Best Supporting Actress in 1986. She also appeared in a couple of TV series, including "Scenery from Pavilion".  In 1994 she appeared in Huang Jianxin's film, The Wooden Man's Bride.

Wang was a councilor of 5th Chinese Film Association, and the vice chairwoman of CFA Jiangsu committee.

Filmography 
Golden Path I (1975)
Golden Path II (1976)
Horizon of Blue Sea (1979)
Legend of Tianyun Mountain (1980)
Xu Mao and His Daughters (1981)
Romance of Blacksmith Zhang (1982)
Our Niu Baisui (1983)
Qiu Jin: A Revolutionary (1984)
Sunrise (1985)
The Men's World (1987)
God of the Mountains (1992)
The Wooden Man's Bride (1994)
The Calligraphy Master (2015)

References

External links 

Dianying.com

1949 births
Living people
Actresses from Jiangsu
People from Xuzhou
Chinese Peking opera actresses
20th-century Chinese women singers
Singers from Jiangsu
Chinese film actresses
Chinese television actresses
20th-century Chinese actresses
21st-century Chinese actresses